The 1993 BC Lions finished in fourth place in the West Division with a 10–8 record. They appeared in the West semi-final.

Offseason

CFL Draft

Preseason

Regular season

Season standings

Season schedule

Awards and records

1993 CFL All-Stars
FB – Sean Millington, CFL All-Star
OG – Rob Smith, CFL All-Star

Playoffs

West semi-final

References

BC Lions seasons
BC Lions
1993 in British Columbia